Zhejiang Ocean University (ZJOU) is a comprehensive public university based in Zhoushan city, Zhejiang province, China.

History 
The university was created in 1988 from the merger of Zhejiang Fishery University (established in 1958) and Zhoushan Junior Teachers College (founded in 1978).

The university was accredited to offer bachelor's degree programs in 1982 and to provide postgraduate degree programs in 2005.

The university offers disciplines that specialize in the seas and oceans. It allows the development of multi-disciplines including science, agronomy, engineering, literature, medicine, management, teaching and economics.

Administration

Colleges and departments
The university is organized into the following colleges.
School of Marine Science 	
School of Humanities
School of Marine Fisheries and Maritime School 	
School of Foreign Languages
School of Naval Architecture and Civil Engineering 	
Xiaoshan School of Science and Technology
School of Electrical and Mechanical Engineering 	
Donghai School of Science and Technology (private college)
School of Food and Pharmacy and Medical School 	
Putuo School of Science and Technology
School of Mathematics, Physics and Information Science 	
Department of Physical Education and Art Teaching
School of Petroleum and Chemical Engineering 	
Center for Public Experiment and Computer Network
School of Business Administration 	
School of Continuing Education
School of Public Administration (Department of Social Science) 
Teacher Development Center

References

External links

 

Maritime colleges in China
Universities and colleges in Zhejiang
Educational institutions established in 1988
1988 establishments in China